Filmy is a Canadian Category B Hindi language specialty channel owned by SoundView Entertainment Inc.

Filmy broadcasts Bollywood films, music programs, and other Bollywood film based programming.

History
In October 2007, SoundView Entertainment Inc. was granted approval by the Canadian Radio-television and Telecommunications Commission (CRTC) to launch  a television channel called Sahara Filmy, described as "a national, third-language ethnic Category 2 specialty service devoted to the Hindi-speaking community. The programming schedule shall only consist of feature films, made-for-TV movies, actor interviews, documentaries and similar movie-related programming."

The channel launched as Filmy on April 29, 2009 initially on Rogers Cable.

See also
 Filmy

References

External links
 Filmy

Digital cable television networks in Canada
Movie channels in Canada
Television channels and stations established in 2009
Hindi-language television stations
Sahara India Pariwar
Hindi-language television in Canada